The 1935 Swiss Grand Prix was a Grand Prix motor race held at Bremgarten on 25 August 1935.

Classification

Notes
 Hanns Geier crashed in practice, ending his driving career.
 Paul Pietsch took over Hans Stuck's car after it developed a mechanical problem.

Swiss Grand Prix
Swiss Grand Prix
Grand Prix